A food ration bar (also known as emergency food bar or compressed food bar)  is a type of biscuit generally included in emergency rations and compact field rations. A cross between a hardtack and an energy bar, these shelf-stable products provide a high caloric density and are generally made of grain flour, sugar, and vegetable oil.

Food ration bars may be consumed directly or broken up and mixed with water for a porridge. The composition depends on usage: humanitarian versions place a focus on protein content and nutrition fortification, while naval products place the emphasis on it being non-thirst-provoking.

Some example ration bars are:

 A-28 (rice) and A-29 (wheat), two USDA humanitarian standard products
 BP-5 Compact Food, fortified
 Datrex, for lifeboat use
 Type 90, Chinese military ration

Food bar standards are issued by maritime agencies such as the U.S. Coast Guard and humanitarian agencies such as the World Food Program, each for their respective use cases.

Food ration bars under the name of  "compact dry food" are a core part of the military food of the Chinese People's Liberation Army for field and emergency use.

See also 
 High energy biscuit, a World Food Program standard product for humanitarian use; functionally similar but are proper biscuits in form

References

External links 
 2019 PLA LQ-002 Compact 24 Hour Food, review by Steve1989MREInfo on YouTube – example of Chinese food bars in current use

Biscuits
Survival equipment